Biella is a  city and  (municipality) in the northern Italian region of Piedmont, the capital of the province of the same name, with a population of 44,324 as of 31 December 2017.

It lies in the foothills of the Alps, in the Bo mountain range near Mt. Mucrone and Camino, an area rich in springs and lakes fed by the glaciers, the heart of the Biellese Alps irrigated by several mountain streams: the Elvo to the west of the town, the Oropa river and the Cervo to the east. Nearby natural and notable tourist attractions include the Zegna Viewpoint, the Bielmonte Ski Resort, Burcina Natural Reserve, and the moors to the south of town. The Sanctuary of Oropa is a site of religious pilgrimages. In 2003, the Sanctuary of Oropa Sacred Mountain of Oropa became a UNESCO World Heritage Site.

Biella is an important wool processing and textile centre. There is a small airport in the nearby comune of Cerrione.

History

Origins
The first inhabitants of the area were Ligurians and Celts. This has been ascertained from archaeological finds: they lived near streams and lakes, at first as fishermen and hunters, and later, herders.

A Ligurian people, the Victimuli, fanned out in the plain of Biella (the Bessa) and exploited gold veins near the Elvo, an activity which continued through the early Middle Ages, and even today panning for gold continues as a local hobby.

Tools and necklaces dating from the Bronze Age—or, according to some, Iron Age— attesting to Biella's antiquity, were found in the Burcina Reserve.

Middle Ages

The city's name appears for the first time as Bugella in a document of 826AD, recording the donation of Bugella to Count Busone by Louis the Pious, son of Charlemagne), Holy Roman Emperor; a further document of 882AD records some land transactions of Charles the Fat in favour of the church of Vercelli.

In the 10th century the town was inhabited by Alemanni, Lombards and Franks, who built the first walls as a defence against barbarian invasions. Extant remains from this period include the Lombard Romanesque Baptistry and the adjacent church of S. Stefano, around which the town grew: it is today's cathedral, although the original 5th-century building was demolished in 1872.

On April 12, 1160, Uguccione, bishop of Vercelli, granted important trade privileges to anyone residing on Piazzo hill (elevated section of the city) as an incentive to the establishment of a place of refuge against the warfare between the Guelphs and Ghibellines of Vercelli: this was the birth of the Borgo del Piazzo, site of the handsome public square, the Piazza Cisterna, and a Palace fronting it, the doors of which have stone capitals and terracotta ornaments.

Bishop Uguccione's castle was destroyed in a revolt in 1377 that led to the subjection of Biella, along with its dependent comuni, to the yoke of the House of Savoy.

Modern times

In the 14th and 15th centuries, the Visconti family competed with Savoy for the possession of the Biella region. The 17th century saw a similar competition between French and Spanish forces, and Biella was actually occupied in 1704; in 1706 Pietro Micca, a Biellese soldier, saved nearby Turin from a siege that would have meant the invasion of Biella by the French as well—but paid for it with his own life.

In 1798 Biella was once again occupied by the French, and after the Battle of Marengo, Biella was formally annexed by France. The Congress of Vienna returned it to Savoy.

In 1859 Biella was besieged by the Austrians but Garibaldi forced an end to the siege, and the town became part of the province of Novara, losing its status as regional capital that it had received in the 17th century from Charles Emmanuel I of Savoy; it was transferred to the province of Vercelli in 1927.

In World War II Biella was the scene of armed resistance.

In 1992, the new province of Biella was formed, separating the territory from the north-western sector of the province of Vercelli.

Wool industry
In 1245 the statutes of Biella were already referring to the wool workers' and weavers' guilds: hardly surprising in view of the region's high mountain pastures and copious water supply needed for washing fleece and powering mills. In the 17th and 18th centuries, as elsewhere in Italy, silk was an important industry, and a silk factory was built in the town in 1695. In 1835, however, the town's textile history came round full circle when the same building was put to use as a wool factory with the introduction of mechanical looms, putting Biella at the forefront of modern improvements in the industry. Around 1999/2000, a progressively worse economic crisis in the wool sector forced many local wool mills to close since they could not compete with the prices of imported fabrics and clothing.

Culture
Biella is the home of Citta dell'arte (City of the Arts) - Fondazione Pistoletto. In 1994, Italian artist Michelangelo Pistoletto began Progetto Arte, whose aim was to unify the artistic, creative and social-economic aspects (e.g. fashion, theatre, design, etc.). In 1996, he founded City of Arts/Citta dell'arte – Fondazione Pistoletto in a formally unused textile factory near Biella, as a centre supporting and researching creative resources, producing innovative ideas and possibilities. The Citta dell'arte is divided into different Uffici/Offices (work, education, communications, art, nutrition, politics, spirituality, and economics).

Government

Main sights
Biella Cathedral
Biella Baptistery in romanesque style (10th-11th century), annexed to the cathedral, housing 13th-century frescoes
 Giardino Botanico di Oropa, a botanical garden
 Sacro Monte and sanctuary of Oropa
 Biella Synagogue
 Renaissance church of San Sebastiano (1504)
 Oasi Zegna, a natural preserve

Main business and brands

 Cerruti 1881 (wear)
 Ermenegildo Zegna (wear)
 Vitale Barberis Canonico (wear)
 Fila (sportswear)
 Drago Lanificio in Biella (luxury fabrics)
 Banca Sella (bank)
 Cassa di Risparmio di Biella e Vercelli (bank)
 Menabrea (beer)

Transport
Biella has two railway stations.  The main one, Biella San Paolo railway station, opened in 1856, is the junction of the Biella–Novara and Santhià–Biella railways.  A second railway station, Biella Chiavazza, is in the district of Chiavazza, a short distance along the line towards Novara. The Biella funicular connects a lower station on Via Curiel, in the city's Biella Piano quarter, with an upper station on Via Avogadro in the city's medieval Biella Piazzo quarter.

Biella-Cerrione Airport in Cerrione serves Biella.

International relations

Twin towns — sister cities
Biella is twinned with:
 Kiryū, Japan
 Arequipa, Peru
 Tourcoing, France
 Weihai, China

Notable people
 Virginia Angiola Borrino (1880–1965), physician who was the first woman to serve as head of a University Pediatric Ward in Italy
 Claudio Botosso (born 1958), actor
 Tavo Burat (1932–2009), teacher and journalist
 Nino Cerruti (1930–2022), stylist, designer, and businessman
 Chiara Corbelletto (born 1956), Italian-New Zealand sculptor
 Mario Gariazzo (1930–2002), Italian screenwriter
 Alberto Gilardino (born 1982), Italian FIFA World Cup Winner
 Pier Giorgio Morandi (born 1958), Italian oboist and conductor
 Ugo Nespolo, Italian painter and sculptor
 Michelangelo Pistoletto (born 1933), artist
 Elvina Ramella (1927–2007), operatic soprano

References

External links

ATL
The Wool Road
Museo del territorio/Ecomusei
Unofficial portal
Official web site for European Sacred Mounts 

 
Cities and towns in Piedmont